886 Washingtonia is a minor planet orbiting the Sun. It was discovered on 16 November 1917, from Washington, D.C. and is named after the 1st President of the United States, George Washington.

Discovery circumstances
Credit for the discovery of 886 Washingtonia has been given to George Peters of the US Naval Observatory, who was the first to report it. The object was, however, observed four days earlier by Margaret Harwood, who was advised not to report it as a new discovery because "it was inappropriate that a woman should be thrust into the limelight with such a claim". The first woman to be credited with the discovery of a minor planet was Pelageya Fedorovna Shajn, eleven years later.

References

External links 
 Lightcurve plot of 886 Washingtonia, Palmer Divide Observatory, B. D. Warner (2003)
 Asteroid Lightcurve Database (LCDB), query form (info )
 Dictionary of Minor Planet Names, Google books
 Asteroids and comets rotation curves, CdR – Observatoire de Genève, Raoul Behrend
 Discovery Circumstances: Numbered Minor Planets (1)-(5000) – Minor Planet Center
 
 

000886
Discoveries by George Peters
Named minor planets
000886
19171116